Memory Studies is a quarterly peer-reviewed academic journal that covers the study of "the social, cultural, political and technical shifts affecting how, what and why individuals, groups and societies remember and forget". The journal's editors-in-chief are Andrew Hoskins (University of Glasgow), Amanda Barnier (Macquarie University), Wulf Kansteiner (Aarhus Universitet, Denmark), and John Sutton (Macquarie University). It was established in 2008 and is currently published by SAGE Publications.

Abstracting and indexing 
Memory Studies is abstracted and indexed in:
 Scopus
 Social Sciences Citation Index
 ZETOC

External links
 

SAGE Publishing academic journals
English-language journals
Sociology journals
Quarterly journals
Publications established in 2008